The Cursa de Bombers is an annual road running race over 10 km which takes place in April in Barcelona, Catalonia, Spain.

History and course
The race was created in 1999 as a joint venture between the Bombers de Barcelona (Firemen of Barcelona) and Nike as a way of protesting against the Ayuntamiento de Barcelona (Barcelona City Council) for their refusal to respond to the firefighters' demands for improved working conditions. The race has since grown significantly as both an elite and popular race, with major Spanish runners such as Marta Domínguez taking part and over 13,000 athletes running the course by the 2007 edition of the event. A record of 18,014 people participated in the 2010 race – edition which held IAAF Bronze Label Road Race status.

The course of the race is uphill for the first  and has a slow decline over the remaining . The race has a looped circuit which is clockwise in direction and goes through a number of major roads in the city. Beginning on Avenida Marques de Argentera, near the Parc de la Ciutadella, the race heads west toward Passeig de Colom before going northwards along Avinguda del Paral·lel. The route turns eastwards at Calle Floridablanca and follows a straight path along Gran Via de les Corts Catalanes. The race begins to loop back to the start at this point, passing through Passeig de Sant Joan, Ronda de Sant Pere and finally onto Via Laietana

The elite race has been dominated by Kenya runners, with all but two editions of the men's race having a Kenyan victor and half of the past women's race winners coming from the country. In spite of this, the race remains popular among the top domestic runners, such as Chema Martínez, Nuria Fernández, and Carles Castillejo, who have reached one of the top three spots. The 2011 elite race was reduced to a sub-national level race as only those who were registered with the Catalan Athletics Federation were allowed to compete. With little competition, and hot weather to contend with, the winning times were among the slowest ever for the race.

Past winners

Key:

Statistics

See also
Barcelona Marathon
San Silvestre Vallecana

References

External links
Official website 

10K runs
Athletics competitions in Catalonia
Athletics competitions in Spain
Recurring sporting events established in 1999
Athletics in Barcelona